The Kaltwasser Pass (German: Kaltwasserpass or Chaltwasserpass, Italian: Bocchetta d'Aurona) is an Alpine pass connecting Switzerland and Italy.

The pass is located between the Wasenhorn or Punta di Terrarossa and the Monte Leone.

Climbing the pass requires about 5 hours and is generally a fairly easy hike.  It runs from the old Simplon Hospice, a Swiss heritage site of national significance, past the Kaltwasser or Aurona glacier to the Italian Alpe di Veglia.

References

Mountain passes of Switzerland
Mountain passes of Italy
Mountain passes of the Alps
Lepontine Alps
Italy–Switzerland border crossings